Muhammed II was fifth independent Shah of Shirvan and second Shah of Layzan whose father was first Layzanshah Yazid b. Khalid. He was nephew of first independent Shirvanshah Haytham b. Khalid. He attacked to Shirvanshah Ali, took him, his son Abbas and his grandson Abu Bakr as hostages. Abu Bakr escaped but others executed. Muhammed II Shirvanshah united crowns of Layzan and Shirvan and Yazidi branch of Shirvanshahs replaced Haythamid branch.

References

10th-century monarchs in Asia